Peter George "Peet" Coombes (1952–1997) was an English guitarist, vocalist and songwriter. He was the lead singer and primary songwriter of the group The Tourists, the first charting band to feature guitarist Dave Stewart and singer Annie Lennox, later to gain greater fame as the duo Eurythmics.

The Catch and The Tourists
Coombes was born in Bradford, England, but spent most of his early life in Sunderland, where he met Dave Stewart. Stewart introduced Coombes to Annie Lennox, whom he had met when she was working in a London restaurant. In 1976 the three formed a post-disco band called The Catch, which released one single "Borderline/Black Blood" that failed to chart. The band renamed itself The Tourists, adding bassist Eddie Chin and drummer Jim Toomey. Coombes played guitar, sang and wrote most of the Tourists' original songs.

After releasing their third album in 1980 the band dissolved. Dave Stewart was keen to move from the Tourists' guitar-based new wave sound to explore synthesiser-led pop and formed Eurythmics with Annie Lennox.

Post-Tourists
Peet Coombes and Eddie Chin started a group called Acid Drops but it did not release recorded material. Coombes moved to London and did not perform during most of the 1980s. In 1992 he moved to Cornwall and created the band Diminished Responsibility with amateur producer and bassist Andy Brown, his wife Cathy and with Dave Farghally on drums. The band did not release any recordings.

In the 1990s his health deteriorated and by late 1996 he could no longer perform. He died in 1997 due to cirrhosis of the liver related to long term heavy consumption of alcohol. He was 45 years old.

Coombes' sons Joey and Robin Coombes formed the hip hop group Task Force.

References

External links

1952 births
1997 deaths
English rock guitarists
English male guitarists
English new wave musicians
English songwriters
People from Sunderland
Musicians from Tyne and Wear
20th-century English musicians
20th-century British guitarists
20th-century British male musicians
The Tourists members
Deaths from cirrhosis
Alcohol-related deaths in England
British male songwriters